Dotilla myctiroides is a species of sand bubbler crab found on tropical shores and mud-flats of India, Thailand, Malaysia, Indonesia, Singapore and Sri Lanka. They breed throughout the year but activity peaks during the monsoons. This species builds a burrow, called an "igloo", in unstable sand as well as in well-drained and firm sand. In building the igloo, the crab excavates sand and forms it into spherical pellets. These pellets are used to form a circular wall and roof in the burrow. The resulting structure holds a small amount of air in addition to the crab itself.

References

External links

Ocypodoidea
Crustaceans described in 1852
Crustaceans of Asia